Anna Maria Korzeniak (born 16 June 1988 in Kraków) is a Polish former professional tennis player.

Anna Korzeniak was born to Stanisław and Ewa Korzeniak. She began playing tennis at the age of five and was coached by her father. Her favourite surface is clay.

Korzeniak reached a career-high ranking of No. 182, and she won ten ITF tournaments.

ITF finals

Singles: 16 (10–6)

References

External links 
 
 
 

1988 births
Living people
Sportspeople from Kraków
Polish female tennis players
20th-century Polish women
21st-century Polish women